Geographia Technica is a biannual open-access peer-reviewed academic journal. The journal focuses on quantitative and technical methods in the discipline of geography. The journal was established in 2006 and the editor-in-chief is Ionel Haidu (University of Lorraine).

See also
American Association of Geographers
Geographic Information Systems
National Council for Geographic Education

References

External links

Geography journals
English-language journals
Open access journals
Biannual journals
Technical geography
Creative Commons Attribution-licensed journals